Domingo García is an American lawyer and politician. He serves as the 51st President of League of United Latin American Citizens (LULAC). He previously served as a member of the Dallas City Council, Mayor Pro Tem of Dallas, and a member of the Texas House of Representatives. He was elected the president of LULAC in 2018.

Early life and career

Garcia was born on February 26, 1958. Raised by his parents Alberto "Beto" Garcia Perez and Manuela Garcia Cano. Garcia's father was a rancher and held a successful concrete company in the Dallas area. Garcia is the oldest of his seven siblings. Growing up in for most of his childhood Richardson Texas. Garcia played soccer, football, and even won golden gloves in boxing one year. He was heavily active with the school counsel of his high school Berkner. García earned Bachelor of Arts from the University of North Texas in 1980 and his Juris Doctor from Texas Southern University's Thurgood Marshall School of Law in Houston in 1983. He then worked as a personal injury lawyer.

Political career
García was first elected to the Dallas City Council in 1991 and served until 1995. He was elected Mayor Pro Tem of Dallas in 1993 and became the first Latino to hold that post. He served in the Texas House of Representatives for three terms. He was the co-author of HB1403, known as the Texas Instate-Tuition Act, or the Texas Dream Act. This bill was the first in the country to allow undocumented students from Texas high schools to pay in-state tuition at Texas State Universities.

García was a candidate in Dallas's 2002 mayoral special election, but did not win. He also ran for the United States House of Representatives in the 2012 elections but lost 49% to 50%. He opted not to run for Congress in 2014.

LULAC

García was elected president of the League of United Latin American Citizens (LULAC) in 2018.

Personal Life

Garcia married the love of his life Honorable Dr. Elba Garcia in the 80's and had two wonderful children name Joaquin Garcia and Fernando Garcia. Garcia has always had an interest in sports, traveling, politics, business, and helping the community.

References

External links
 
 

Living people
Democratic Party members of the Texas House of Representatives
American politicians of Mexican descent
Hispanic and Latino American state legislators in Texas
Texas Southern University alumni
Year of birth missing (living people)
League of United Latin American Citizens activists